Brooklyn is an unincorporated community in Coffee County, Alabama, United States, located  east-northeast of Opp.

References

Unincorporated communities in Coffee County, Alabama
Unincorporated communities in Alabama